Gunnar Lindholm (28 December 1887 – 2 September 1972) was a Swedish fencer. He competed in the individual sabre event at the 1912 Summer Olympics.

References

External links
 

1887 births
1972 deaths
Swedish male sabre fencers
Olympic fencers of Sweden
Fencers at the 1912 Summer Olympics
Sportspeople from Stockholm